The We and the I is a 2012 American comedy-drama film co-written and directed by Michel Gondry. The film is about teenagers who ride the same bus route on their last day of high school. It was shot in The South Bronx, New York City, New York.

The film was screened in the Directors' Fortnight section at the 2012 Cannes Film Festival. It won International Critics' prize at 2012 Deauville American Film Festival. During the 2012 Toronto International Film Festival, 108 Media and Paladin acquired the North American rights to the film, with a release date of March 8, 2013.

Cast
 Michael Brodie as Michael
 Monica Pinto as Daughter
 Francesca Pinto as Daughter
 Nicholas Pinto as Son
 Teresa Lynn as Teresa
 Laidychen Carrasco as Laidychen
 Raymond Delgado as Little Raymond
 Jonathan Ortiz as Jonathan
 Raymond Rios as Big Raymond
 Jonathan Worrell as Big T
 Alex Barrios as Alex
 Meghan Niomi Murphy as Niomi
 Brandon Diaz as Brandon
 Elijah Canada as Elijah
 Esmeralda Herrera as Esmeralda
 Manuel Rivera as Manuel
 Luis Figueroa as Luis
 Jacobchen Carrasco as Jacobchen
 Mia Lobo as Bus Driver
 Amanda Kay Riley as Beautiful Girl On Bike
 Jillian Rice as Jillian
 Kenneth Quinonez as Kenny
 Amanda Mercado as Amy

References

External links
 
 

2012 films
2010s American films
2010s coming-of-age comedy-drama films
2010s English-language films
American coming-of-age comedy-drama films
Films about buses
Films directed by Michel Gondry
Films set in New York City
Films shot in New York City